Nenad Novaković is a Bosnian footballer who last played for Churchill Brothers S.C. as a defender.

References

1986 births
Living people
Association football central defenders
Bosnia and Herzegovina footballers
FK Sloboda Tuzla players
NK Rudar Velenje players
OFK Gradina players
FK Timok players
FK Mladost Velika Obarska players
Naft Maysan FC players
Akhaa Ahli Aley FC players
AC Tripoli players
Churchill Brothers FC Goa players
Iraqi Premier League players
Lebanese Premier League players
I-League players
Bosnia and Herzegovina expatriate footballers
Expatriate footballers in Slovenia
Bosnia and Herzegovina expatriate sportspeople in Slovenia
Expatriate footballers in Serbia
Bosnia and Herzegovina expatriate sportspeople in Serbia
Expatriate footballers in Lebanon
Bosnia and Herzegovina expatriate sportspeople in Lebanon
Expatriate footballers in India
Bosnia and Herzegovina expatriate sportspeople in India